Orthomegas folschveilleri is a species of beetle in the family Cerambycidae. It is found in Mexico (Guerrero).

References

Beetles described in 2011
Endemic insects of Mexico
Prioninae